Padshah Begum was a superlative imperial title conferred upon the empress consort or 'First Lady' of the Mughal Empire and was considered to be the most important title in the Mughal harem or zenana. This title can be equivalent with "empress" in English, but in only approximate terms in the Mughal context.

Etymology 
Padeshah, Padshah, Padishah, or Badishah is a superlative royal title, composed of the Persian pād (master) and shāh (king), which was adopted by several monarchs claiming the highest rank, equivalent to that of an ancient Persian notion of "The Great" or "Great King", and later adopted by post-Achaemenid and Christian Emperors. Its Arabized pronunciation as Badshah was used by Mughal emperors, and Bashah or Pasha was used by Ottoman Sultans.

Begum, begam, baigum or beygum  is a female royal and aristocratic title from Central and South Asia. It is the feminine equivalent of the title baig or bey, which in Turkic languages means chief or commander. It usually refers to the wife or daughter of a beg.

List of Padshah Begum

Historical usage 
The title of 'Padshah Begum' could only be bestowed upon the chief or principal wife, a sister, mother, or a favored daughter of the Mughal emperor and could not be held by more than one lady simultaneously. This was evidenced by the fact that Emperor Jahangir's wife, Nur Jahan, could only be given the title after his chief wife, Saliha Banu Begum (the Padshah Begum for most of his reign), had died in 1620.

Where the consorts of the Mughal emperors were concerned, the title could only be bestowed upon the chief wife of the emperor. The title was first bestowed upon Maham Begum, who was the chief wife of Emperor Babur. It was held by Bega Begum during the reign of Humayun. Then this title was bestowed upon Hamida Banu Begum by Akbar who bore it until her death in 1604. Emperor Jahangir bestowed this title upon his chief wife, Saliha Banu Begum, and then to her successor (after her death), Nur Jahan. Emperor Shah Jahan bestowed this title upon his chief wife, Mumtaz Mahal but after she died, he bestowed it upon his daughter Jahanara Begum. Emperor Muhammad Shah bestowed this title upon his chief wife Badshah Begum.

The title was also bestowed upon the daughter of the emperor, such as Emperor Shah Jahan's daughter, Princess Jahanara Begum, and Emperor Aurangzeb's daughter, Princess Zinat-un-Nissa, both of whom bore the title throughout their lives.
 		 	
In some cases, the title was also bestowed upon the sister of the emperor. Aurangzeb bestowed the title on his sisters Roshanara Begum and Jahanara Begum. When a Timurid Shahzadi held the title it meant "Empress amongst princesses".

See also
 Padshah
 Begum
 Mughal Empire

References

Begum Pädshāh, the mother of his Majesty, busied herself in the ladies' apartments of the palace in interceding for the Shaikh, and said to the Emperor. My son, he has an aged and decrepit mother in Ajmer,
Author of the Tabuna-i-Akbari.

2A grant in aid of livelihood.
138

Titles
Persian words and phrases
Women of the Mughal Empire
Titles in India
Titles of national or ethnic leadership